The Ballroom is a 2007 Brazilian-French romantic drama film directed by Laís Bodanzky. The action is set in a dance hall (gafieira) in São Paulo, frequented by elderly people.

Cast
Tonia Carrero as Alice
Leonardo Villar as Álvaro
Stepan Nercessian as Eudes
Betty Faria as Elza
Cassia Kiss as Marici
Paulo Vilhena as Marquinhos
Maria Flor as Bel
Elza Soares as Ana
Jorge Loredo
Marly Marley as Liana
Clarisse Abujamra

Reception
David Parkinson of The Guardian called it a "quirky ensemble piece", and praised it for being "superbly choreographed." Daily Expresss Allan Hunter labeled it as "bittersweet" and gave a rating 3 out of 5, saying "If Robert Altman had ever made a film about an old-fashioned dance hall it might have looked something like The Ballroom." Writing for the Evening Standard, Derek Malcom commended it by affirming: "If the film doesn't always convince, it has some wonderful moments. Bodanzky’s sympathy with his characters is obvious — and the music is as much an attraction as the series of stories we are told about them." On the other hand, David Jenkins from Time Out gave a more negative review, stating "this wannabe-steamy film never manages to generate any dramatic heat because it spreads itself far too thinly across its oversized and mundane cast."

References

External links

2007 films
Brazilian romantic drama films
Films directed by Laís Bodanzky
Films set in São Paulo
Films shot in São Paulo
French romantic drama films
2007 romantic drama films
2000s Portuguese-language films
2000s French films